The Sony Xperia 10 III is a mid-range Android smartphone manufactured by Sony Mobile. Part of Sony's Xperia series, it was unveiled alongside the Xperia 1 III & Xperia 5 III on April 14, 2021. It is the Sony's first Xperia mid-ranger to support 5G network.

Design 
The Xperia 10 III has a plastic frame and Corning Glass 6 for the screen and back panel. The earpiece, front-facing camera, notification LED, and various sensors are housed in the top bezel, meanwhile the single front-firing speakers housed in the bottom bezel. The bezels have been trimmed more than the Xperia 10 II, resulting the Xperia 10 III more compact in dimension. The power button/fingerprint sensor, a dedicated Google Assistant button, and  volume rocker are located on the right side of the device, while the 3.5 mm headphone jack is located on the top. The rear cameras are located at the upper left-hand corner of the phone, with the LED flash above. The bottom edge has the primary microphone and a USB-C port.  It is rated IP65/IP68 dust/water-proof up to 1.5 metres for 30 minutes. Black, White, Blue, and Pink were the colours available at launch. An exclusive Yellow colour was released in Japan by NTT Docomo Mobile Network.

Specifications

Hardware 
The device is powered by the Qualcomm Snapdragon 690 5G SoC and the Adreno 619L GPU.  It is available with 6 GB of RAM, and 128 GB of storage. MicroSD card expansion is supported up to 1 TB with a single-SIM or hybrid dual-SIM setup. The display is the same panel, size and resolution as the 10 II, using a 6-inch (150 mm) 21:9 1080p (1080 × 2520) OLED display which results in a pixel density of 457 ppi, but now with the addition of HDR10 support. The 10 III has a 4500 mAh battery, an increased 25% over its predecessor, which can be recharged at up to 30 W via the USB-C port. A triple camera setup is present on the rear, with a 12 MP primary sensor with PDAF, now supports 10 fps AE burst mode and brighter aperture at f/1.8, an 8 MP telephoto sensor and an 8 MP ultrawide sensor. The front-facing camera has an 8 MP sensor.

Software 
The Xperia 10 III runs on Android 11 at launch and an update to Android 12 is available by OTA. It has a Side Sense bar shortcut on the side of the phone's display to launch menu of shortcuts to apps and features since Xperia XZ3, now with the addition a widget to control Sony headphones app.

References

Notes

Android (operating system) devices
Sony smartphones
Mobile phones introduced in 2021
Mobile phones with multiple rear cameras
Mobile phones with 4K video recording